Steve Bennett is the leader of Starchaser Industries, a rocket building program once in competition for the Ansari X Prize.
 
Bennett was born in England and was fascinated by rockets from an early age, especially from seeing man’s first walk on the moon.
From the age of ten he was building rockets in his back yard powered by sugar and other readily available ingredients.

Later in life he was funded by a British sugar manufacturer in his efforts to capture the X-prize.

References 

Year of birth missing (living people)
Living people